Michael Stewart (born December 20, 1977, Columbia, Tennessee) is a professional boxer. He has held the USBA light welterweight title.  In perhaps his most high-profile bout, he was knocked out by Ricky Hatton in round 5.  He also lost an IBF title fight by decision to Sharmba Mitchell.

Michael was a contestant on the reality series, Contender Season 2 on ESPN.  On it, he was picked to be a member of the Blue Team. In the first round, he fought Ebo Elder, winning by knockout, but Grady Brewer beat him by unanimous decision in the semifinals winning 50-45 on all scorecards.

External links
 

1977 births
Living people
The Contender (TV series) participants
American male boxers
People from Columbia, Tennessee
People from New Castle, Delaware
Welterweight boxers